Pol Verschuere (Kortrijk, 18 January 1955) was a Belgian professional road bicycle racer. Verschuere won a stage in the 1980, 1982 and the 1986 Tour de France.

Major results

1975
 National Amateur Road Race Championship
1978
Izegem
Kortrijk
Trèfle à Quatre Feuilles
1979
Grote Prijs Stad Zottegem
1980
Soignies
Tour de France:
Winner stage 22
1981
Le Samyn
1982
Ninove
Tour de France:
Winner stage 7
Beernem
1983
Dentergem
1986
De Haan
Tour de France:
Winner stage 1
1987
Beernem

External links 

Official Tour de France results for Pol Verschuere

Belgian male cyclists
1955 births
Living people
Belgian Tour de France stage winners
Tour de France Champs Elysées stage winners
Sportspeople from Kortrijk
Cyclists from West Flanders